Scott H. Stalker (born 1975) is a United States Marine Corps Master Gunnery Sergeant currently serving as the Command Senior Enlisted Leader (CSEL) of the United States Space Command. Before, he has been the Command Senior Enlisted Leader (CSEL) of the United States Cyber Command, the National Security Agency (NSA) and the Central Security Service (CSS) in Fort Meade, Maryland, serving from March 16, 2018, until August 28, 2020. He was the first to hold the position of CSEL for all three agencies during their career. He has served in multiple military operations throughout his career.

Career
Stalker was born in Lebanon, New Hampshire, in 1975 and enlisted in the United States Marine Corps in January 1993. After recruit training, he attended Marine Combat Training, followed by the Basic MAGTF Intelligence Analyst Course at Virginia Beach, Virginia.

Stalker's joint operational deployments include tours with the U.S. Army's 25th Infantry Division and 101st Airborne Division, the U.S. Navy's USS Guam LPH-9, USS Nassau LHA-4, USS Nashville LPD-13, and USS Blue Ridge LCC-19, and the U.S. Air Force's 31st OSS.

His deployments with the Marine Corps include tours with HMM-365, Marine All Weather Fighter Attack Squadron 332, 26 MEU (SOC), 1st Battalion, 7th Marines, RCT-7, 1st Marine Division, 2nd Marine Division, and 3rd Marine Division. Additionally, he deployed multiple times to Southeast Asia while assigned to the Joint POW/MIA Accounting Command.

His combat and contingency deployments include Operation Restore Hope in Somalia; Deny Flight and Operation Provide Promise in Bosnia and Herzegovina; Operation Silver Wake, conducting a non-combatant evacuation operation in Albania; Operation Guardian Retrieval in the Democratic Republic of the Congo; and a unit deployment program in Okinawa, Japan. He also served as part of Operation Iraqi Freedom, where he was a member of a border patrol advisory team, training Iraqi soldiers in the north of the country, as regimental intelligence chief, and was involved in the military investigation of the Salman Pak facility.

Additional garrison assignments include Joint Intelligence Center Pacific, Marine Corps Intelligence Activity, Marine Corps Forces Special Operations Command, Marine Corps Cyberspace Command, the Senior Enlisted Advisor to the Joint Chiefs of Staff J2, and most recently as the Command Senior Enlisted Leader of the Defense Intelligence Agency until 2018, the first Marine to hold that position. Stalker is the first individual to have held both positions within their career as both the DIA and NSA CSEL. As DIA CSEL Stalker coordinated with senior military officials from all branches of services to address ongoing intelligence-related threats.

In June 2020, it was announced that Stalker would succeed Roger A. Towberman as the senior enlisted leader for United States Space Command.

Military training

Stalker is a graduate of the MAGTF Basic and Intelligence Chief's Course (honor graduate), Marine Corps Martial Arts Green Belt Instructor course, Army Air Assault School (top 3 graduate), SNCO Advanced and Career Course (distinguished graduate), Warfighter PME, Joint Advanced Cyber Warfare Course, Sr. Enlisted Joint PME I & II, and the National Defense University's KEYSTONE, and is a Special Operations Capability Specialist. He earned a Bachelor of Arts from American Military University in intelligence analysis and completed a leadership certificate at Harvard's Kennedy School of Government in June 2018. He is currently completing a graduate program where he plans to receive a Master of Science degree in Cyber Security in late 2020. In 2001, he received a letter of commendation from the director of the Central Intelligence Agency.

Awards and decorations

Stalker has earned 7 service stripes.

Personal life
He is married to Malerie B. Stalker from Manassas, Virginia. They live in Maryland with their daughter, Olivia, and three English Bulldogs.

Notes

References

United States Marines
People from Lebanon, New Hampshire
United States Cyber Command
National Security Agency
United States Marine Corps personnel of the Iraq War
People of the Somali Civil War
Living people
Recipients of the Defense Superior Service Medal
1975 births